The Army of India Medal (AIM) was a campaign medal approved in 1851 for issue to officers and men of the British Army and the Army of the Honourable East India Company.  A retrospective award following the precedent set by the Naval General Service Medal and the Military General Service Medal, it served to reward service in various actions from 1803 to 1826.

Criteria
The Army of India Medal was approved on 21 March 1851 as a retrospective award by the Honourable East India Company, who bore the cost of the medal, to survivors of various actions during the period 1803–1826. This period encompassed four wars: the Second Mahratta War (1803–04), the Gurkha War (1814–16), the Pindaree or Third Mahratta War (1817–18), and the First Burmese War (1824–26), together with the siege of Bhurtpoor (1825–26). Each battle or action covered by the medal was represented by a clasp on the ribbon and twenty-one were sanctioned. While the maximum awarded to one man was seven, most medals were awarded with a single clasp.  

The medal was only awarded to survivors and, as such, there are substantially fewer medals issued when compared with the number of men who served during this period.  This was largely due to the extreme lapse of time between the wars commemorated and the issue of the medal—forty-eight years had passed between the first battle commemorated —Allighur in 1803—and the date of issue, 1851. A total of 4,500 medals were awarded.

While the medal was awarded to both British and Indian soldiers on the same basis, the clasp Ava was only awarded to Europeans, since the Honourable East India Company had already awarded a medal for this Burma campaign to all native Indian soldiers present.

Appearance
It was designed by William Wyon.The obverse bears an effigy of a young Queen Victoria wearing a diadem. On either side of the effigy is the inscription VICTORIA and REGINA.The reverse bears and an allegorical representation of Victory holding a laurel branch in her right hand and a wreath in her left. In the foreground is a lotus flower, with a palm tree and trophy of arms in the background. Above is the inscription TO THE ARMY OF INDIA, below in the exergue 1799-1826..British recipients had their name and unit impressed on the rim of the medal in block Roman capitals.

Clasps
The following clasps were issued, they reading downwards from the top of the medal:

References and notes

Bibliography
 Mussell, John (ed.) (2014). Medals Yearbook 2015, Token Publishing Limited. 
 Joslin, Edward; Litherland, Andrew & Simpkin, Brian. (eds.) (1988). British Battles and Medals, Revised edition, Spink & Sons Ltd. London. 
 Mayo, John Horsley (1897). Medals and Decorations of the British Army and Navy, Volume 2. A. Constable, London.

External links
Army of India Medal Roll (1803-1826)
Naval recipients of the Burmah Medal 1824-1826 (ADM 171/11) available via Ancestry
London Gazette announcement of Army of India Medal, 28 February 1851

British campaign medals
Medals of the Honourable East India Company